Tan Lee Wai (born 20 July 1970) is a former Malaysian badminton player. At the 1989 South east Asian games, Tan won bronze medal in doubles and women's team event.  In 1991 and 1993 Southeast Asian Games, Tan won 3 bronze medals respectively at each games. At the Asian championship in 1992, she won bronze in doubles with Tan Sui Hoon. In 1994 she won bronze medal at the Commonwealth Games and in Asian Cup with Lee Wai Leng. She also represented her country twice in World championships in two disciplines.

Achievements

Commonwealth Games 
Women's doubles

Asian Championships 
Women's doubles

Asian Cup 
Mixed doubles

Southeast Asian Games 
Women's doubles

Mixed doubles

IBF International 
Women's doubles

References

External links 

1970 births
Living people
20th-century Malaysian women
Malaysian sportspeople of Chinese descent
Malaysian female badminton players
Badminton players at the 1990 Commonwealth Games
Badminton players at the 1994 Commonwealth Games
Commonwealth Games silver medallists for Malaysia
Commonwealth Games bronze medallists for Malaysia
Commonwealth Games medallists in badminton
Badminton players at the 1994 Asian Games
Competitors at the 1989 Southeast Asian Games
Competitors at the 1991 Southeast Asian Games
Competitors at the 1993 Southeast Asian Games
Southeast Asian Games bronze medalists for Malaysia
Southeast Asian Games medalists in badminton
Asian Games competitors for Malaysia
Medallists at the 1994 Commonwealth Games